The Embassy of Austria in Islamabad is the diplomatic mission of Austria to Pakistan. It is located at 7-A, Street 21 in Sector F-8/2, Islamabad. Austria and Pakistan established diplomatic relations in 1956. 

The embassy provides consular services to Austrian citizens in Pakistan, and oversees bilateral relations between both countries. It is concurrently accredited to Afghanistan. 

The current Austrian ambassador to Pakistan is Brigitta Blaha, appointed in December 2014.

See also 
 Austria–Pakistan relations

References

External links
 

Austria–Pakistan relations
Austria
Islamabad